The High Council of State (al majlis al'aelaa lildawla), is an advisory body for Libya formed under the terms of the Libyan Political Agreement which was signed on 17 December 2015. The agreement resulted from United Nations supported peace talks and has been unanimously endorsed by the Security Council. The High Council of State is able to advise the interim Government of National Accord (GNA) and the House of Representatives (HoR), currently based in  Tobruk, and can express a binding opinion on  these bodies under certain circumstances. The members of the council were nominated by remaining members of the General National Congress who in 2014 were not elected to the HoR.

History
The council met for the first time on 27 February 2016  and it was formally established at a ceremony at the  Radisson Blu Al Mahary Hotel in Tripoli on 5 April 2016. 

The council moved into the headquarters of the former General National Congress, at the Rixos Al Nasr Convention Centre, on 22 April 2016. 

On 31 August 2016, a 94-member rival High Council of State was proclaimed in Benghazi and its members wanted to join the official body.

On 21 September 2016, the High Council of State took legislative powers.

On 10 October 2016, the Rixos Al Nasr Convention Centre was attacked by gunmen loyal to the GNC. On 15 October 2016, forces loyal to the GNC took over the building and announced the return of the Ghawil cabinet. Then, fighting occurred between Sarraj loyalists and Ghawil forces. Following these clashes, the council once again took up residence in the Radisson Blu Al Mahary Hotel.

Chairman of the High Council

Saleh al-Makhzoum served as the first deputy chairman and Muhammed Imazzeb served as second deputy chairman under Sewehli. They were replaced by Naji Mukhtar and Fawzi Aqab, respectively, during the tenure of al-Mishri.

See also

Presidential Council (Libya)
Government of National Accord
House of Representatives (Libya)

References

External links
High Council of State - Official Facebook feed (Arabic)
High Council of State - Official Facebook feed (English)

Government of Libya
Politics of Libya
Political organizations based in Libya